Opera continued to be one of the most important features of the Edinburgh International Festival in the third decade.

Edinburgh Festival Opera, a company which first presented operas at the festival in 1965, contributed five productions (with two of them performed over two years), while Glasgow-based Scottish Opera performed seven. Meanwhile, the tradition of inviting guest companies continued with the English Opera Group, Hamburg State Opera, Teatro Comunale, Florence (Maggio Musicale Fiorentino), Frankfurt Municipal Opera, National Theatre, Prague, Deutsche Oper Berlin (twice), Deutsche Oper am Rhein (twice), Teatro Massimo, Palermo, Hungarian State Opera, and Royal Opera, Stockholm all appeared at the festival.

Distinguished conductors included Claudio Abbado, Gerd Albrecht, Daniel Barenboim, Richard Bonynge, Christoph von Dohnányi, Alexander Gibson, Charles Mackerras,  and Giuseppe Patanè.

Major opera directors included Peter Ebert, Götz Friedrich, Colin Graham, Jean-Pierre Ponnelle, Peter Ustinov, and Wieland Wagner.

Star female singers included Janet Baker, Agnes Baltsa, Teresa Berganza, Ileana Cotrubaș, Leyla Gencer, Anna Moffo, Birgit Nilsson, Regina Resnik, Renata Scotto, Anja Silja, Elisabeth Söderström, Joan Sutherland, Tatiana Troyanos, Julia Varady, Shirley Verrett, and Galina Vishnevskaya, while male singers included  Luigi Alva, Nicolai Gedda, Dietrich Fischer-Dieskau, Geraint Evans, Tito Gobbi, Luciano Pavarotti, Peter Pears, Ruggero Raimondi and John Shirley-Quirk.

1967 (three productions)

1968 (eight productions)

1969 (four productions)

1970 (seven productions)

1971 (four productions)

1972 (six productions)

1973 (four productions)

1974 (six productions)

1975 (four productions)

1976 (five productions)

Opera in concert

Die drei Pintos by Carl Maria von Weber, orchestrated by Gustav Mahler, was performed by the Edinburgh Festival Opera, in concert at the Usher Hall on 25 August 1976.

See also
Opera at the Edinburgh International Festival: history and repertoire, 1947–1956
Opera at the Edinburgh International Festival: history and repertoire, 1957–1966
Drama at the Edinburgh International Festival: history and repertoire, 1947–1956
Drama at the Edinburgh International Festival: history and repertoire, 1957–1966
Ballet at the Edinburgh International Festival: history and repertoire, 1947–1956
Ballet at the Edinburgh International Festival: history and repertoire, 1957–1966
Ballet at the Edinburgh International Festival: history and repertoire, 1967–1976
Musicians at the Edinburgh International Festival, 1947 to 1956
Musicians at the Edinburgh International Festival, 1957–1966
Visual Arts at the Edinburgh International Festival, 1947–1976
World premieres at the Edinburgh International Festival
Edinburgh Festival Fringe
List of Edinburgh festivals
List of opera festivals

References

Edinburgh Festival
Classical music festivals in Scotland
Opera festivals
Opera in Scotland
Annual events in Edinburgh
Opera-related lists
1967 music festivals
1968 music festivals
1969 music festivals
1970 music festivals
1971 music festivals
1972 music festivals
1973 music festivals
1974 music festivals
1975 music festivals
1976 music festivals